The 1983–84 NCAA football bowl games featured 16 games starting early in December and ending on January 2, 1984. The Tangerine Bowl was renamed the Florida Citrus Bowl.

Bowl games
NOTE: Rankings used are the final regular season AP Rankings whenever noted

Final rankings

AP Poll
 Miami (FL)
 Nebraska
 Auburn
 Georgia
 Texas
 Florida
 BYU
 Michigan
 Ohio State
 Illinois
 Clemson
 SMU
 Air Force
 Iowa
 Alabama
 West Virginia
 UCLA
 Pittsburgh
 Boston College
 East Carolina

Coaches' Poll
 Miami (FL)
 Nebraska
 Auburn
 Georgia
 Texas
 Florida
 BYU
 Ohio State
 Michigan
 Illinois
 SMU
 Alabama
 UCLA
 Iowa
 Air Force
 West Virginia
 Penn State
 Oklahoma State
 Pittsburgh
 Boston College

Clemson was on probation by the NCAA during the 1983 season; they were therefore ineligible to receive votes in the Coaches' Poll

References